Sam Son beach (Vietnamese: Bãi biển Sầm Sơn) is a resort beach in Vietnam. It’s located in Sầm Sơn city, Thanh Hóa Province, Bac Trung Bo region, Vietnam, 16 km east of Thanh Hoa City.
The Sầm Sơn beach became a resort beach in 1906 when French colonists began to build facilities here. The beach is 6 km long, extending from estuary of Lạch Hới to the foot of Trường Lệ mount.

Notes

External links
Information about Sam Son Beach

Beaches of Vietnam
Landforms of Thanh Hóa province
Tourist attractions in Thanh Hóa province